Dagong is a town in Hai'an in Jiangsu province, China. , it has three residential communities and 12 villages under its administration.

See also 
 List of township-level divisions of Jiangsu

References 

Township-level divisions of Jiangsu
Hai'an